Iris Winnifred King née Ewart (1910–2000), was born in Kingston, Jamaica, West Indies, on September 5, 1910. She attended the Kingston Technical High School in Kingston and later the Roosevelt University in Chicago where she studied political science and public administration from 1951-'53.

In 1958–1959 she served as a mayor of Kingston and was the first woman in that function.

References

External links
https://web.archive.org/web/20120330120217/http://www.constitution-and-rights.com/irisKing.htm

1910 births
2000 deaths
Women mayors of places in Jamaica
Mayors of Kingston, Jamaica
20th-century Jamaican women politicians
20th-century Jamaican politicians
Jamaican expatriates in the United States